Abdullah Al-Jabri (Arabic:عبد الله الجابري; born 13 July 1987) is an Emirati footballer. He currently plays as a midfielder.

External links

References 

Emirati footballers
1987 births
Living people
Al Ain FC players
Al Dhafra FC players
Place of birth missing (living people)
UAE First Division League players
UAE Pro League players
Association football midfielders